Ernest Letherland (23 June 1894 – 12 April 1947) was a British long-distance runner. He competed in the marathon at the 1924 Summer Olympics.

References

External links
 

1894 births
1947 deaths
Athletes (track and field) at the 1924 Summer Olympics
British male long-distance runners
British male marathon runners
Olympic athletes of Great Britain
People from Bulwell
Sportspeople from Nottinghamshire